Major Jaswant Singh (3 January 193827 September 2020) was an officer of the Indian Army and an Indian Cabinet Minister. He was one of the founding members of the Bharatiya Janata Party (BJP), and was one of India's longest serving parliamentarians, having been a member of the Lok Sabha or the Rajya Sabha almost continuously between 1980 and 2014. He was NDA's Vice-presidential candidate in the 2012 Indian vice presidential election. Singh was the only leader from Rajasthan who had the distinction of becoming the Minister Of External Affairs, Finance and Defense.

He was elected on a BJP ticket to the Rajya Sabha five times (1980, 1986, 1998, 1999, 2004) and to the Lok Sabha four times (1990, 1991, 1996, 2009). During the Vajpayee administration between 1998 and 2004, he held multiple cabinet portfolios including Finance, External Affairs and Defence. He also served as the Deputy Chairman of the Planning Commission between 1998 and 1999. In the aftermath of India's nuclear tests of 1998, he was deputed by Prime Minister Vajpayee to act as India's representative to hold repeated, long-term dialogue with the United States (represented by Strobe Talbott) on matters related to nuclear policy and strategy; the outcome of the sustained engagement was positive for both countries. After his party lost power in 2004, Jaswant Singh served as Leader of Opposition in the Rajya Sabha from 2004 to 2009.

Singh incurred the displeasure of his party colleagues when, after the party suffered its second successive defeat in 2009, he circulated a note demanding a thorough discussion on the debacle. Weeks later, a book authored by him was released, in which he was found to have written sympathetically about Jinnah. Post the event, Singh found himself marginalized within the party. In the elections of 2014, his party decided not to field him from any constituency. He decided to contest anyway as an independent from his native constituency of Barmer (against Col. Sonaram Chaudhary) in Rajasthan. He was expelled from the BJP on 29 March 2014 when he did not withdraw his independent candidature, and went on to lose the election.

On 7 August 2014, Jaswant Singh suffered a fall in the bathroom of residence and suffered a serious head injury. In June 2020 he was admitted to Army's Research and Referral hospital in Delhi for treatment. He remained in a state of coma for six years till his death in 2020.

Early life 
Singh was born on 3 January 1938 in the village of Jasol in Barmer district of Rajasthan in a Rajput family. His father was Sardar Singh Rathore of Jasol and mother was Kunwar Baisa. Singh was married to Sheetal Kanwar. They had two sons. His elder son, Manvendra Singh, is a former Member of Parliament from Barmer. He was an officer in the Indian Army in the 1960s and was an alumnus of Mayo College and the National Defence Academy, Khadakwasla.

After his education from the National Defence Academy, he was enrolled in the Indian Army in the year 1957 and was designated to the position of the Captain of the Central India Horse unit of allegiance. And he was also a participant of Indo-Pakistani War of 1965 and was the commander of his unit and was the Major at the time of Sino-Indian border dispute of the year 1965 after which he retired from the Indian Army in the next year, 1966 to join politics after serving the Armed forces for 10 years. He was a close accompany of Bhairon Singh Shekhawat and made his links with Bharatiya Jana Sangh. He was a member and associate of Rashtriya Swayamsevak Sangh from the 1960s.

Career events

In the government of Vajpayee, Singh was External Affairs Minister, and later went on to become the Finance Minister. He was also the Defence Minister when George Fernandes was forced to resign after the Tehelka exposure.

Singh is widely regarded for his handling of relations with the United States which were strained after the 1998 Indian nuclear tests but which ameliorated soon after culminating in the 2000 visit of U.S. President Bill Clinton to India. His skill as a negotiator and diplomat during talks with the United States has been well acknowledged by his U.S. counterpart Strobe Talbott.

Singh has been frequently criticized by political parties for escorting terrorists to Kandhahar, Afghanistan. They were released by the Government of India in exchange for passengers from the hijacked Indian Airlines flight IC 814.

Singh was denied a Member of Parliament ticket for Barmer by BJP for the 2014 Indian general election over Col. Sonaram Choudhary. Unhappy, Singh filed his nomination as an independent candidate from Barmer constituency. Subsequently, he was expelled from BJP for six years and lost the election.

Political life
Singh entered politics in the 1960s, with the first few years of his political life seeing limited recognition, until he was initiated in the Jan Sangh. He tasted success in his political career in 1980 when he was first selected for the Rajya Sabha, the upper house of Indian parliament. He served as Finance minister in the short-lived government of Atal Bihari Vajpayee, which lasted just from 16 May 1996, to 1 June 1996. After Vajpayee became Prime Minister again two years later, he became Minister for External Affairs of India, serving from 5 December 1998 until 1 July 2002. Responsible for foreign policy, he dealt with high tensions between India and Pakistan. In July 2002 he became Finance Minister again, switching posts with Yashwant Sinha. He served as Finance Minister until the defeat of the Vajpayee government in May 2004 and was instrumental in defining and pushing through the market-friendly reforms of the government. He was conferred the Outstanding Parliamentarian Award for the year 2001. On 19 August 2009, he was expelled from BJP after criticism over his remarks in his book which allegedly praised the founder of Pakistan in his book Jinnah – India, Partition, Independence. His last major position was as Leader of Opposition in the Rajya Sabha from 2004 to 2009.

He was denied a ticket by the party to contest the 2014 Lok Sabha Parliamentary Elections from the Barmer-Jaisalmer constituency in Rajasthan. He was subsequently expelled from the BJP after deciding to contest the elections as an independent candidate and lost to his former party's candidate Col. Sonaram Choudhary. Jaswant Singh was elected from Darjeeling Seat from the year 2009 to 2014.

Ministries and Work 
Jaswant Singh held many ministries under the government of Atal Bihari Vajpayee, including several important such as Defence, External Affairs and Finance. He has also held many important positions including that of Electronics and Science and Technology.

Minister of Finance (First time) 
Singh remained as the Minister of Finance in the short-lived government of First Vajpayee government from 16 May 1996 to 1 June 1996. In the short-lived government where he was Minister for just 24 days and there was also economic difficulty, a crisis due to the political instability, and there was a loss of employment similar to the 1991 Indian economic crisis which lead to the decline in the value of Indian currency. It was followed by the instability after the fall of Narsimha Rao government. After this there was a 1996 Bank Scam after this the fall of Atal Bihari Government automatically Singh was removed from the position and succeeded to P. Chidambaram for the position.

Minister of External Affairs 
After Atal Bihari Vajpayee becomes the Prime Minister of India for the second time in the year 1998, then Singh was appointed as the Minister of External Affairs and succeeded Atal Bihari Vajpayee himself for the position. He was at that time first Rajasthani to be a Minister of External Affairs of India at Union level in the Central Government. Singh has been one of the most trusted man of Vajpayee and was given task of making good international relation with other nations. He has been represented nation at international level in the times of Kargil War and India's nuclear test. He was the one who went to Kandahar after plane hijack. He remained Minister till 5 December 2002 after the removal of George Fernandes due to the Tehelka conspirancy. As the Minister of External Affairs he launched the first free-trade agreement (with Sri Lanka) in South Asia's history, initiated India's most daring diplomatic opening to Pakistan, revitalized relations with the US, and reoriented the Indian military, abandoning its Soviet-inspired doctrines and weaponry for close ties with the West.

Pokhran-II Pressure 

 BJP, came to power in 1998 general elections with an exclusive public mandate. BJP's political might had been growing steadily in strength over the past decade over several issues. At that time after the successful test of the Second Nuclear Bomb it was considered a masterstroke by the government, it was said that Singh along with Atal Bihari Vajpayee and George Fernandes were the one who played the important role in the functioning. He was the one of the member of "Operation Shakti" and among the 12 people who knew about the secret mission. His most essential role came into existence after there were made international pressure on the nation due to the secrecy of the mission when Atal Bihari Vajpayee made a public announcement for the mission. At that time strong criticism was drawn from Canada on India's actions and its High Commissioner. Sanctions were also imposed by Japan on India and consisted of freezing all new loans and grants except for humanitarian aid to India. Some other nations also imposed sanctions on India, primarily in the form of suspension of foreign aid to India and government-to-government credit lines. However, the United Kingdom, France, and Russia refrained from condemning India. The biggest affect was on the relations of India with United States and there were made many restrictions on India and at that time Singh managed to control America at United Nations.

Kargil War 

After the Kargil War and the win of Indian Armed forces in July 1999 the use of WMD led to a serious pressure of the world on India and this was led by the anger of United States against India due to Pokhran-II Nuclear test series and supported in the favour of Pakistan. At that time Singh was the one who represented India at the international level and had made many interviews with news channels and also made diplomatic talks with leaders and representatives of the United States], China, France, and many other nations. After that Singh made an interview with Atal Bihari Vajpayee in which to strengthening the position of Indian Government there was a release of a leaked conversation of Pervez Musharraf in which he admitted that he was involved in the attack on India in Kargil district in 1999 and that he also planned an attack to kill Nawaz Sharif and become the President of Pakistan. This was known to be a masterpiece and led to a very strong point resulting in the India's diplomatic relations and proving the burden of war on General Musharraf. After that India was freed from allegations of the Kargil War.

Kandahar Hijack 

The terrorists of Taliban hijacked the Indian Airlines Flight 814 on 24 December 1999 on the Tribhuvan International Airport of Kathmandu, Nepal. The motive for the hijacking apparently was to secure the release of Islamist figures held in prison in India. The hostage crisis lasted for seven days and ended after India agreed to release three militants – Mushtaq Ahmed Zargar, Ahmed Omar Saeed Sheikh, and Mulana Masood Azhar. This hijack was also helped by Dawood Ibrahim and Al-Qaeda linked Jihadis. Then after too much suggestions and pressure then Prime Minister Atal Bihari Vajpayee agrees on the demand of the hijackers of Taliban and sends Ajit Doval in Kandahar and after that Vajpayee decided to send Singh as he was the one of the most trusted man. He was sent to Kandahar of Afghanistan to escort the terrorists and take back the crew members. It was also said that Singh has made a secret talks with Taliban Foreign Minister Wakil Ahmed Muttawakil and made an agreement of 3 terrorists in exchange of 170 crew members including men, women and children. Later terrorists also demanded 900 crores rupees and 36 other terrorists, but somehow it was denied. On 31 December 1999 on New Year of 2000 all 176 were released and they all landed to Indira Gandhi International Airport.

The incident is seen as a failure of the BJP government under Prime Minister Atal Bihari Vajpayee and IB chief Ajit Doval said that India would have had a stronger negotiating hand if the aircraft had not been allowed to leave Indian territory. Doval, the IB chief, who led the four-member negotiating team to Kandahar, described the whole incident as a "diplomatic failure" of the government in their inability to make the US and UAE use their influence to help secure a quick release of the passengers. Singh also received criticism for praising the Taliban for their co-operation after the hostages had been returned.

Minister of Defence 
Singh was appointed as the Minister of Defence of India in the year 2000 after minister before him, George Fernandes was convicted in the Tehelka case and was forced to resign from his position. He remained as the Minister from 2000 to 2001 after which Fernandes was re-appointed as the Minister of Defence after getting cleanchit in the conspiracy. After that in the year 2002 he was re-appointed as the Minister of Finance of India in the Vajpayee Government.

Finance Minister (Second term) 

After returning of George Fernandes as the Defence Minister for the second time after getting cleanchit in Tehelka case, Singh was appointed as the Union Minister of Finance in 2002 and remained till 2004 after the Vajpayee Government lost the 2004 General Election and passed the position to P. Chidambaram. In his reign of 2 years for the second time he has been known to make market-friendly reforms in the Economy of India and due to his good diplomatic skills and good relations with other nations from the times when he was the Minister of External Affairs.

In late 2002 and 2003 the government pushed through economic reforms. Due to the good administration of Jaswant Singh the country's GDP growth exceeded 7% every year from 2003 to 2007, following three years of sub-5% growth. Increasing foreign investment, modernisation of public and industrial infrastructure, the creation of jobs, a rising high-tech and IT industry and urban modernisation and expansion improved the nation's international image. Good crop harvests and strong industrial expansion also helped the economy. The rate of stock growth under him as the Finance Ministry was  also at the one of the highest point in the Indian Economic Growth groth history under the period of two years of his ministry and the Inflation rate was also very much good in the period of the two years. From 2002 to 2004, the economy of India was one of the fastest growing in the world and one of the leading agricultural nations and second most output after China.

Positions and offices

Leader of Rajya Sabha 
Jaswant Singh was appointed as the Member of Parliament of Rajya Sabha for the fourth time in the year 1999 and after the formation of the Vajpayee Government he was appointed as the Leader of Rajya Sabha on 13 October 1999 and remained till the time of fall of the Vajpayee Government on 22 May 2004 and succeeded the position to then Prime Minister, Manmohan Singh. In the time period Jaswant Singh held many crucial positions and ministries and before that he was previously serving in the position of Minister of External Affairs of India at Union Government and in this period he served as Minister of Defence and Finance.

Leader of Opposition (Rajya Sabha) 
After the Vajpayee's government fell down and after that Singh who was earlier a Member of Parliament from Rajya Sabha from the state of Rajasthan was appointed as the Leader of Opposition of Rajya Sabha and hold the position for a time period of 5 years from 2004 to 2009. The mastermind of Rajasthan, Bhairon Singh Shekhawat when was appointed as the Vice President of India and at that time Singh took the responsibility of strengthening the party in Central level and main focus in the state of Rajasthan. After the fall of National Democratic Alliance in the year 2004 and the weakening of senior-BJP leaders like Atal Bihari Vajpayee, Murli Manohar Joshi, Lal Krishna Advani and the politics of other big leaders like Bhairon Singh Shekhawat in central level, Singh as the leader of Opposition shifted his politics for the strengthening of the party in ground roots and in state levels in states of Western India such as Gujarat, Madhya Pradesh and specially Rajasthan. Under this period Singh also served many non political position in the Indian government remaining as the leader of Opposition including: "Member of Committee for General purposes (from 2005-2006)", "Member, Committee on Science and Technology, Environment and Forests (from August 2004 to August 2004)" and "Member of Joint Parliamentary Committee on the Installation of Portraits/Statues of National Leaders and Parliamentarians in Parliament House Complex (August 2004May 2009)". After that then he was expelled from the party.

Vice president nominee

He was the candidate for the post of Vice president for the NDA in 2012. Singh had filed his nomination papers on 20 July in the presence of National Democratic Alliance coalition leaders. Three sets of papers- one each by L. K. Advani, Sumitra Mahajan and Yashwant Sinha, supporting Singh's candidature were submitted to the returning officer Viswanathan. His candidature was announced by the NDA on 16 July. He meet All India Anna Dravida Munnetra Kazhagam leader Jayalalithaa and Naveen Patnaik of Biju Janata Dal on 6 August asking them to support his candidature. He lost to Hamid Ansari who was the UPA's Vice presidential candidate. In the Election he got 238 seats and received 32.69% of the votes, while Hamid Ansari got 490 seats and received 67.31% of the votes.

Controversy

 A controversy erupted immediately after the release of his book, "A Call to Honour," in which Singh insinuated that a mole had existed in the Prime Ministerial Office during the tenure of P. V. Narasimha Rao, who had leaked information to U.S. sources about India's nuclear tests. Soon after, Indian Prime Minister Manmohan Singh challenged him to name the mole. In response, Singh sent a letter to him. The letter, Manmohan Singh said later, had no signature, and no name of any mole. Jaswant Singh then backed off, saying his views on the subject were based on a "hunch".
 Controversy hovered around him again when on 17 August 2009 another book authored by him, entitled Jinnah: India-Partition-Independence, was released. In this he praised Mohammad Ali Jinnah and claimed that the centralised policy of Jawaharlal Nehru was responsible for Partition. He was later expelled from the primary membership of BJP as a result of the ensuing controversy. In interviews with media he quoted BJP as narrow-minded and to have limited thought. In 2010, he was readmitted to BJP.

Death 

In June 2020, Singh was admitted to the Delhi's Army ( and was being treated for sepsis with multi-organ dysfunction syndrome and effects of a severe head injury he suffered as a result of a fall in 2014. On 27 September he suffered cardiac arrest. Singh died at the age of 82 years. His death was triggered as a sign of honour and was mourned with full esteem and with state funeral. His last rites were done by his son Manvendra Singh and was cremated in Jodhpur, Rajasthan with full Hindu rituals. Due to COVID-19 pandemic only family members were present and very few relatives. Prime Minister Narendra Modi reacted on his death stated that "Jaswant Singh Ji served our nation diligently, first as a soldier and later during his long association with politics. During Atal Ji's Government, he handled crucial portfolios and left a strong mark in the worlds of Finance, Defence and External affairs. Saddened by his demise"

Positions held

 1980Elected to Rajya Sabha (1st term)
 1986Re-elected to Rajya Sabha (2nd term)
 19861989Member, Public Accounts Committee, Rajya Sabha
 19861989Member, Committee on Privileges, Rajya Sabha
 19861989Member, Committee on Public Undertakings, Rajya Sabha
 1989Elected to 9th Lok Sabha from Jodhpur
 19901992Member, Consultative Committee constituted under the Punjab State Legislature (Delegation of Power) Act, 1987
 19891991Member, Panel of chairmen, Lok Sabha
 19911996Chairman, Estimates Committee
 1991Re-elected to 10th Lok Sabha (2nd term) from Chittorgarh
 19911992Chairman, Committee on Environment and Forests
 19911994Member, Business Advisory Committee
 1992Member, Joint Parliamentary Committee to enquire into Irregularities in Securities and Banking Transactions
 19931996Chairman, Standing Committee on Energy
 1996Re-elected to 11th Lok Sabha (3rd term) from Chittorgarh
 May 1996June 1996Union Cabinet Minister, Finance
 March 1998February 1998Deputy Chairman, Planning Commission
 July 1998Re-elected to Rajya Sabha (3rd term)
 December 1998July 2000Union Cabinet Minister, External Affairs
 February 1999October 1999Union Cabinet Minister, Electronics (Simultaneous charge)
 August 1999October 1999Union Cabinet Minister, Surface Transport (Simultaneous charge)
 October 1999Re-elected to Rajya Sabha (4th term)
 March 2001October 2001Union Cabinet Minister, Defence (Simultaneous charges)
 July 2002April 2004Union Minister, Finance & Company Affairs
 April 2002May 2004Union Cabinet Minister, Finance
 2004Re-elected to Rajya Sabha (5th term)
 2004Leader of Opposition, Rajya Sabha
 August 2004August 2006Member, Committee on Science and Technology, Environment and Forests
 August 2004May 2009Member, Joint Parliamentary Committee on the Installation of Portraits/Statues of National Leaders and Parliamentarians in Parliament House Complex
 August 2005Member, General Purposes Committee
 2009Re-elected to 15th Lok Sabha (4th term) from Darjeeling
 August 2009December 2009Chairman, Committee on Public Accounts
 September 2009Member, Committee on Budget
 January 2010Member, Committee on Public Accounts

Books

See also

 List of Rajputs
 Ministry of Defence
 Ministry of External Affairs
 Ministry of Finance
 Manvendra Singh
 Outstanding Parliamentarian Award
 Jinnah: India, Partition, Independence
 Bharatiya Janata Party
 First Vajpayee ministry
 Second Vajpayee ministry
 Third Vajpayee ministry
 Deputy Chairman of the Planning Commission
 Banga Bibhushan
 Leader of Rajya Sabha

References

Notes

Citations

Further reading 
*

External links 

|-

|-

|-

|-

|-

|-

Jaswant Singh
1938 births
2020 deaths
India MPs 1989–1991
India MPs 1991–1996
India MPs 1996–1997
India MPs 2009–2014
People from Barmer, Rajasthan
Military personnel from Rajasthan
Bharatiya Janata Party politicians from Rajasthan
Mayo College alumni
Lok Sabha members from West Bengal
Candidates in the 2014 Indian general election
Leaders of the Opposition in the Rajya Sabha
Deaths from sepsis
People from Chittorgarh district
People from Jodhpur district
People from Darjeeling district
Ministers for External Affairs of India
Finance Ministers of India
Military personnel of the Indo-Pakistani War of 1965
People of the Sino-Indian War
Infectious disease deaths in India
Indian vice-presidential candidates
Indian Hindus
Indian autobiographers
Muhammad Ali Jinnah
Rajasthani-language writers
Rajasthani people
Commerce and industry ministers
Politicians from Jaipur
Indian anti-communists
English editors
Anti-monarchists
Hindu revivalist writers
Hindu reformers
Members of the Cabinet of India
Vajpayee administration
Candidates in the 2009 Indian general election
Ministers for Corporate Affairs
Rajya Sabha members from Rajasthan
Lok Sabha members from Rajasthan
Defence Ministers of India
The Darling Foundation Prize laureates